Zachary David Sobiech (May 3, 1995 – May 20, 2013) was an American singer-songwriter and musician from Lakeland, Minnesota, who was a member of the band A Firm Handshake. The single "Clouds" gained extensive media attention on YouTube, prior to Sobiech's death from cancer in May 2013. It charted on the Billboard Hot 100, eventually becoming a hit also in the UK, Canada and France. His philosophy was that in his last days of life due to his cancer, he needed to make people happy.

Life and career
In his early years, Sobiech attended St. Croix Catholic School in Stillwater, Minnesota (Class of 2009). He later attended Stillwater Area High School (Class of 2013). At age 14, Sobiech was diagnosed with osteosarcoma, a bone cancer that mostly affects children. CBS reported that during his treatment he underwent 10 surgeries and 24 rounds of chemotherapy. He started writing music after his diagnosis.

In May 2012 his doctors informed him that he had up to a year to live. Sobiech recorded the song "Clouds" about his battle with cancer, and released it as a YouTube video in December 2012. It went viral, surpassing 3 million views at the time of his death. It currently has more than 21.6 million views as of September 2022.

A Firm Handshake

Prior to Sobiech's death, he formed the band A Firm Handshake with friends Samantha "Sammy" Brown and Reed Redmond. A Firm Handshake's first EP and only release, Fix Me Up, was released digitally in early 2013, charting in the US, the UK and Canada. The debut single by A Firm Handshake is "How to Go to Confession" featuring Sammy Brown.

Death
Sobiech died on May 20, 2013, of complications from osteosarcoma, at his home in Lakeland, an eastern suburb of Saint Paul, Minnesota, seventeen days after his 18th birthday. His funeral was held at the Catholic Church of St. Michael and he was later buried in St. Michael's Cemetery.

Tributes
Rainn Wilson's YouTube channel SoulPancake released a documentary about Sobiech, directed by director-actor Justin Baldoni, a part of its online reality series, My Last Days. The 22-minute episode of My Last Days: Meet Zach Sobiech has been watched more than 15.6 million times on the main SoulPancake YouTube channel. A further episode entitled My Last Days: Zach Sobiech, One Year Later was created to follow up with Sobiech's family and friends after his death.

Artists have released many tributes, including many cover versions of "Clouds"—with a prominent version of "Clouds" released on SoulPancake, featuring director Rainn Wilson himself, along with Bryan Cranston, Ashley Tisdale, Jason Mraz, Sara Bareilles, Colbie Caillat, Phillip Phillips, Passenger, The Lumineers and many others. The music video on SoulPancake presented in collaboration with Wayfarer Entertainment was directed by Justin Baldoni, produced by Baldoni and Ahmed Kolacek, with Fouad Elgohari as associate producer and Nick Pezzillo as editor. The video has been viewed over 5 million times on the SoulPancake YouTube channel.

On December 5, 2013, a choir of an estimated 5,000 sang Sobiech's hit song "Clouds" at the Mall of America. The event was organized by the KS95 Kids Radiothon in collaboration with the Children's Cancer Research Fund and Gillette Children's Specialty Healthcare.

Legacy
Sobiech's family established the Zach Sobiech Osteosarcoma Fund at Children's Cancer Research Fund. In September 2015, the fund reached $2 million.

Zach's mother Laura Sobiech wrote a memoir about his life, Fly a Little Higher: How God Answered a Mom's Small Prayer in a Big Way.

In early 2016, it was announced that Warner Bros. was developing a film based on Laura Sobiech's book. The film Clouds was released on Disney+ on October 16, 2020. Production started on October 19, 2019, in Montreal, and was directed by Justin Baldoni. The film stars Fin Argus as Zach and Sabrina Carpenter as Sammy.

Discography

Extended plays

Singles

References

External links

The Zach Sobiech Osteosarcoma Fund at Children's Cancer Research Fund

1995 births
2013 deaths
21st-century American male singers
21st-century American singers
American folk rock musicians
American Internet celebrities
Catholics from Minnesota
Deaths from bone cancer
Deaths from cancer in Minnesota
Indie folk musicians
Musicians from Saint Paul, Minnesota
People from Stillwater, Minnesota
People from Washington County, Minnesota
Singer-songwriters from Minnesota